Indonesia–Libya relations was established on October 17, 1991. Indonesia has an embassy in Tripoli and Libya has an embassy in Jakarta. Both nations are members of the Organisation of Islamic Cooperation and the Non-aligned Movement.

In September 2003, Indonesian President Megawati Sukarnoputri visited Tripoli, and reciprocated by Muammar Gaddafi visit to Jakarta in February 2004. After the Arab Spring and the fall of Gaddafi, Indonesian government through the Ministry of Foreign Affairs has offered Libya assistance for the transition to democracy, since Indonesia has had similar experience before.

Notes

External links
Embassy of the Republic of Indonesia in Tripoli, Libya
The Embassy of Libya in Jakarta, Indonesia

Libya
Bilateral relations of Libya